Andrew John Clarke (born 7 April 1976) is a British DJ and record producer and is co-founder of RAM Records, a pioneering label in the drum and bass genre.

Music career

Early years

Andy C was a DJ in his own right but gained a strong reputation and more bookings off the back of the successful "Valley of the Shadows" track, an early drum and bass track that walked the line perfectly between hardcore and drum and bass just as the genres were starting to split. The track, created and released by Origin Unknown (made up of Andy C and Ant Miles)—often referred to as "31 Seconds" or "Long Dark Tunnel" because of the samples it incorporates—made use of a heavy bassline, bell samples and a rolling drum track to produce a popular, easy to recognise track that was easy to mix and became a favourite in dance floors at raves across the UK and beyond. The track was released as an EP in 1993 and has been remixed and re-released several times, and is widely recognised as one of the most influential drum and bass tunes of the early 90s. His signature look (Andy C is rarely seen without a baseball cap) and energetic movement behind the decks when playing make him a recognisable figure.

In 2001, he collaborated with Shimon on the single "Body Rock", which reached number 28 on the UK Singles Chart in January 2002 and became one of the most popular drum and bass songs of the year. However, it also polarized some fans of the genre due to its unusual sound; it utilized a swinging rhythm and "clownish" synthesizer leads, leading to the pejorative term "clownstep" to describe similar tracks that were released in the wake of its success.

Andy C has continued to produce strong selling records released on his label RAM Records throughout the duration of his career, and has earned extensive respect both as a producer and as a DJ. Due to its success as a label, Ram Records has been able to attract and nurture other artists of high calibre, including Chase & Status, Loadstar, Sub Focus and Wilkinson. Showcasing their label and DJ talents, Andy has secured headline acts and their own stage at major events including Creamfields, Global Gathering, The Sunbeat Festival and The Electric Daisy Carnival.

2010–2014
In 2011, Andy C won the Best DJ title in the 2011 Drum & Bass Arena Awards, and since the awards' inception in 2009, he has won the people's vote in the awards for Best DJ each year. He specialises in fast mixing, often employing three turntables. A signature mixing style of Andy is what he refers to as the "Double Drop": lining up two tunes so that both basslines drop at the same time. Andy C has often organised events where he DJs continuously for six hours. In January 2011, Mixmag UK announced the result of 14 month global poll from 35 nominations chosen by other big names in dance music: the survey asked global voters to decide Who is the Greatest DJ of All Time; Andy C was ranked number four on it and the highest British DJ on the list. He is the only DJ to date, to receive in excess of 20 annual 'Best DJ' titles in any genre.

In 2012 Andy C launched a new concept – Andy C Alive, where he uses custom made software and settings to mix both audio and visuals, creating stunning light and laser shows. At the heart of the setup are 3 deck mixing desks, audio and image editing suites and a setup that allows Andy to custom mix content on the fly. These sets need to be custom made for each venue, and to this date Andy C has already had bookings at SXSW in Texas, Beyond Wonderland in California, Vooruit in Gent Belgium and Melkweg in Amsterdam, as well as Brixton Academy and Cambridge Junction.

His talent as a producer and a DJ have earned him extensive respect from his peers, sites as a musical influence and inspiration by some of the biggest names in drum and bass; so diverse is his style that Andy C has played for events run by LTJ Bukem's Good Looking Records, Goldie's Metalheadz and jump up parties like JungleMania and Desire 2000AD. DMC World DJ Championships Hall of Fame Inductee DJ Craze retains that Andy C is his favorite DJ to hear play drum and bass.

His first single in ten years, "Haunting / Workout", was released as a promotional double A-side from the Nightlife 6 compilation on 3 November 2013. It entered the UK Singles Chart at number 188. His next single, "Heartbeat Loud" (with Fiora), was released in November 2014 and entered the UK Singles Chart at number 50.

2015–present 
Andy C released the Singles 'New Era' and 'What Bass?' 2016 and 2017. Throughout 2017 he performed at a string of major festivals.

In 2018 Andy C sold out Wembley Arena in three days, becoming the first Drum and Bass artist to do so.

In 2019, Andy C released the singles 'Till Dawn'  (which had been featured in his sets since 2015) and 'Back & Forth'. He also toured extensively and headlined many festivals throughout the year.

Awards and nominations
Andy C ranked #61 in DJ Magazine's 2010 Top 100 DJs annual poll announced 27 October 2010.

On 1 December 2011 Andy C won the Best DJ title in the 2011 Drum and Bass Arena Awards.

On 29 November 2013, Andy C won Ambassador of Bass Music in the 2013 Bass Music Awards, and his label Ram Records was nominated for Best Label.

In 2019, Andy C won the 'DJ Mag Top 100 DJs - Highest Drum and Bass Award', climbing 11 positions on the previous year to no.79.

Since its inception in 2009, the peoples vote each year for the annual award for best DJ at The Drum and Bass Arena Awards has been won each year by Andy C, up until 2019 when it was awarded to A.M.C

Musical style and influence
He is considered a pioneering force in the drum and bass genre. He specialises in fast mixing, often employing three analogue turntables. A signature mixing style of Andy is what he refers to as "The Double Drop" – lining up 2 tunes so their heaviest basslines drop at the same time.

Personal life
Andy C is a self-confessed tech freak and a lifelong fan of West Ham United.

Discography

Extended plays

Singles

Mix CDs

Remixes

References

External links

 

1973 births
Living people
English DJs
English record producers
English drum and bass musicians
People from Walsall
Electronic dance music DJs
RAM Records artists